Saxe Bannister (1790 – 16 September 1877) was a writer and the first Attorney-General of New South Wales, Australia.

Early life and education
Bannister was born in Steyning, Sussex, son of John Bannister. He matriculated at The Queen's College, Oxford, in December 1808 and graduated B.A. 1813, M.A. 1815.

Career
Bannister volunteered for active service when Napoleon escaped from Elba. With a captain's commission, he was on his way to Belgium when the Battle of Waterloo ended the war. He retired from the army on half-pay and was called to the Bar at Lincoln's Inn.

Attorney-General of New South Wales
Bannister was appointed the first attorney-general of New South Wales in March 1823, and he arrived in Sydney early in 1824. On 17 May 1824, he was sworn in at the first sitting of the Supreme Court of New South Wales. He had been given a salary of £1,200 a year with the right to practise as a barrister, but he became discontented with his position; in October 1825, he was in conflict with Governor Thomas Brisbane on the question whether he was bound to draft a bill which seemed to him to be repugnant to the laws of England.

Bannister appeared to have taken his office and his responsibilities far too seriously; and, though Governor Ralph Darling spoke of Bannister as "often misled by an injudicious zeal, but indefatigable, conscientious and honourable in the highest degree", Bannister found it extremely difficult to work with him. In September 1826, in a dispatch to under-secretary Hay, Darling described one of Bannister's letters to the governor as "very offensive and insolent".

Resignation as Attorney-General of New South Wales
In April 1826, Bannister wrote to Darling to say that he could no longer hold his office at its present remuneration. On 13 October 1826, he was informed that his resignation had been accepted. This furnished Bannister with a grievance for the rest of his long life. Soon after his resignation, he fought a "harmess duel" with barrister and newspaper editor, Robert Wardell.

He left for England on 22 October 1826 and afterwards did a large amount of writing; the British Museum Catalogue lists about 30 of his publications. Many are pamphlets but among the longer works are: Statements and Documents relating to Proceedings in New South Wales in 1824, 1825 and 1826 (1827), Humane Policy; or Justice to the Aborigines (1830), British Colonization and Coloured Tribes (1838), and William Paterson, the Merchant Statesman (1858).

Death
Bannister died at Thornton Heath, England, on 16 September 1877, survived by his wife and a daughter, Mrs Wyndham.

References

External links 

 Colonial Secretary's papers 1822-1877, State Library of Queensland- includes digitised correspondence and letters written by Bannister to the Colonial Secretary of New South Wales

1790 births
1877 deaths
Australian non-fiction writers
Attorneys General of the Colony of New South Wales
Lawyers from Sydney
Alumni of The Queen's College, Oxford
People from Steyning
19th-century Australian politicians
Australian duellists